Wharton Esherick Studio, now housing the Wharton Esherick Museum, was the studio of the craftsman-artist Wharton Esherick (1887–1970), in Malvern, Pennsylvania.  The studio was built between 1926 and 1966, reflecting Esherick's evolving sculptural style—from Arts and Crafts, through German Expressionism, ending with the free form Modernist curves that marked his later work.

There are five structures on the site: his home and studio, the 1956 workshop designed with Louis Kahn, the 1928 German Expressionist log garage which now serves as the museum visitor center, his woodshed, and the recently reconstructed German Expressionist outhouse.

The buildings, from their structural forms down to the door handles and light pulls, were designed and built by Wharton Esherick to create a complete artistic environment. The studio is filled with more than 300 of Wharton Esherick's works, including sculpture, furniture and furnishings, paintings and prints.

The Wharton Esherick Museum was incorporated as a non-profit corporation in 1971, it opened for visitors in 1972, and in 1973 was listed on the National Register of Historic Places.

The studio was declared a National Historic Landmark in 1993.

Under the direction of the museum curator, the Wharton Esherick Museum holds an annual Thematic Woodworking Competition and Exhibition as a means to encourage creative thinking, and to encourage the development of new and imaginative designs for items of everyday use.

The Diamond Rock Schoolhouse, which served as Esherick's painting studio during the 1920s, was acquired by the Wharton Esherick Museum in 2019.

References

External links
 Wharton Esherick Museum
 Wharton Esherick House & Studio, 1520 Horsehoe Trail, Malvern, Chester County, PA: 15 photos, 2 color transparencies, 6 data pages, and 2 photo caption pages at Historic American Buildings Survey

Commercial buildings completed in 1926
National Historic Landmarks in Pennsylvania
Wharton Esherick
Wharton Esherick
Historic house museums in Pennsylvania
Artists' studios in the United States
Esherick, Wharton
Louis Kahn buildings
Art museums established in 1972
National Register of Historic Places in Chester County, Pennsylvania
Esherick
Bungalow architecture in Pennsylvania
American Craftsman architecture in Pennsylvania